"Do Me, Baby" is a 1981 ballad performed by Prince, from his fourth album, Controversy. Although it was credited as being written by him, it is alleged to have been written by his former bassist and childhood friend André Cymone. It was released as the third and final US single from the album. It was later included on his 1993 compilation The Hits/The B-Sides. In 1986, the song was notably covered by R&B singer Meli'sa Morgan. It was featured in one of the opening scenes of the 2007 film Rush Hour 3, with Chris Tucker's character singing along while listening to it on his headphones and simultaneously directing traffic with the dance sequences of Michael Jackson.

Track listing
"Do Me, Baby" (edit) – 3:57
"Private Joy" – 4:25

Meli'sa Morgan version 

American singer Meli'sa Morgan released a cover of "Do Me, Baby" in November 1985. Her version was a number one hit on the US Hot Black Singles chart, where it spent a total of 24 weeks in 1986. It was also her only entry on the US Hot 100, where it charted for a total of 14 weeks and peaked at 46.

Track listing 
Vinyl, 12", 45 RPM, Single

Vinyl, 7", 45 RPM, Single

Credits and personnel 
 Meli'sa Morgan – vocals
 Production – Paul Laurence
 Recording, mixing – Steve Goldman

Charts

Weekly charts

Year-end charts

See also
List of number-one R&B singles of 1986 (U.S.)

References

Prince (musician) songs
1982 singles
1985 singles
Funk ballads
Pop ballads
1980s ballads
Rhythm and blues ballads
Soul ballads
Warner Records singles
Song recordings produced by Prince (musician)
1982 songs
Songs written by Prince (musician)
Songs written by André Cymone